Dimitrije Nešić (20 October 1836 – 9 May 1904) was a Serbian mathematician, professor at the Lyceum of the Principality of Serbia and president of the Serbian Royal Academy.

Biography
Nešić was born to Savka and Stojan Nešić in Belgrade, Principality of Serbia. Nešićs left their hometown Novi Pazar under Ottoman oppression on Serbian population in the area due to the First Serbian uprising. His father Stojan was craftsman and trader while his mother was housekeeper. His grandfather was merchant in Novi Pazar who came to Belgrade in 1808 because of Ottoman anti-Serb actions during the First Serbian Uprising. 

Nešić authored most of the modern mathematics textbooks in Kingdom of Serbia and overall improved the quality of studies in the field. He was sent by the government to travel across Europe and study various metric systems, and he later implemented the information gathered on his travels thus making the first official and modern Serbian metric system.

He was a rector of today's University of Belgrade on two terms and also president of the academy. Dimitrije Nešić was made corresponding member of JAZU and he received Order of St Sava and Order of the White Eagle.

Selected works 
Metarske mere, 1874
Trigonometrija, 1875. 
Nauka o kombinacijama, 1883. 
Algebarska analiza I, 1883. 
Algebarska analiza II, 1883

See also
 Jovan Sterija Popović
 Đura Daničić
 Josif Pančić
 Matija Ban
 Konstantin Branković

References

External links 
 Biography on the website of SANU

1836 births
1904 deaths
Members of the Serbian Academy of Sciences and Arts
Serbian mathematicians
Academic staff of the Lyceum of the Principality of Serbia
Education ministers of Serbia